Knut Utstein Kloster (2 April 1929 – 20 September 2020) was a Norwegian shipping magnate.
His grandfather Lauritz Kloster founded Kloster Rederi in 1924. In 1959 Kloster joined the family business and transformed it into a leading cruise line. 
Together with Ted Arison he founded Norwegian Caribbean Line in 1966.

See also 
 MS The World

References 

1929 births
2020 deaths
Norwegian businesspeople in shipping